Karl Schwetter (1914–2002) was an Austrian film actor and producer.

Selected filmography
 Vagabonds (1949)
 Adventure in Vienna (1952)
 Grandstand for General Staff (1953)
 Crown Prince Rudolph's Last Love (1955)
 The Saint and Her Fool (1957)
 The Priest and the Girl (1958)
 My Niece Doesn't Do That (1960)
 Wedding Night in Paradise (1962)
 The Sweet Life of Count Bobby (1962)
 An Alibi for Death (1963)
 The Model Boy (1963)
 Schweik's Awkward Years (1964)
 In Bed by Eight (1965)
 Heidi (1965)
 Count Bobby, The Terror of The Wild West (1966)

References

Bibliography 
  John Willis. Screen World: 1969, Volume 20. Biblo & Tannen Publishers, 1969.

External links 
 

1914 births
2002 deaths
Austrian film producers
Austrian male film actors
Male actors from Vienna